KLRR (101.7 FM) is a radio station licensed to Redmond, Oregon, and serving Bend, Oregon. Owned by Combined Communications, it broadcasts an adult album alternative format.

History
KLRR “Clear 107” had an adult contemporary format in the late 1980s. The format evolved into more of an adult album alternative sound in the 1990s.  KLRR moved from 107.5 to 101.7 in 1999, as "Clear 101.7".

External links

LRR
Adult album alternative radio stations in the United States
Redmond, Oregon
Radio stations established in 1985
1985 establishments in Oregon